James Murphy (1744–1824) was the Roman Catholic Bishop of Clogher from 1801 to 1824.

Born in Drumshevra near Scotstown, County Monaghan, Ireland, he was ordained a Catholic priest in the Diocese of Clogher in 1768. He was appointed the Coadjutor Bishop of the Diocese of Clogher in Ireland in May 1798.

He became the Roman Catholic Bishop of Clogher on 3 November 1801, following the death of his predecessor, Hugh O’Reilly. Murphy died in office on 19 November 1824 having served as bishop of his diocese for almost twenty-three years. He was succeeded by Bishop Edward Kernan, who had was appointed his Coadjutor Bishop on 18 August 1816.

See also
Roman Catholic Diocese of Clogher

References

Roman Catholic bishops of Clogher
1744 births
1824 deaths
People from County Monaghan
19th-century Roman Catholic bishops in Ireland
18th-century Irish Roman Catholic priests